Zoppo is a surname. Notable people with the surname include:

Marco Zoppo (1433–1498), Italian Renaissance painter
Paolo Zoppo, Italian Renaissance painter
Rocco Zoppo, real name Giovan Maria di Bartolomeo Bacci di Belforte (fl. 1496–1508), Italian Renaissance painter